Kappa Beta Gamma is a sorority founded at Marquette University in Milwaukee, Wisconsin in 1917.

History
On , twelve women of Marquette University founded the campus' first sorority, Kappa Beta Gamma. The founders, and first officers of this group were: 

Weimar was credited with design of the sorority pin.

The immediate aim of the Sorority expressed at its founding was: To Unite the Members in the bond of Sisterhood; to Develop Friendships among the Members During their College Days; to Improve the Members Morally, Socially and Intellectually; and to Foster the Support of College/University, Alma Mater and of God and Country. This was later revised as:
The Sisters of Kappa Beta Gamma International Sorority are an organization dedicated to improving its members morally, socially, and intellectually. As friends, we are committed to bettering our schools and communities by offering leadership opportunities during and beyond our college days. 

In  the sorority established its second chapter, Alpha, at Saint Louis University; St. Louis, Missouri. The chapter at Marquette University then became known as Beta chapter. The first chapters were established at Catholic institutions, with the Sorority later expanding to other institutions.

In  Kappa Beta Gamma installed its first chapter in Canada, the Upsilon chapter at the University of Victoria in Victoria, British Columbia.

This sorority is not a member of the NPC, though chapters will regularly participate with campus panhellenic associations.

Symbols and traditions

The official colors are deep sapphire, pearl white and old gold. The five pointed star is the symbol, while the official flower is the forget-me-not. ΚΒΓ has 2 official jewels, the blue sapphire and white pearl. The Sorority has designated a mascot, Jermain the Lion (Jermain being the last name of the first Grand Mistress, or president).

Founder Mary Weimar designed the sorority badge, a wreath of six pearls and six sapphires encircling Kappa Beta Gamma’s Greek Letters. She also designed the membership pin, a blue shield with a gold stripe running diagonally across it.

Kappa Beta Gamma marks three annual days of remembrance, listed in the order they were established:
 January 22 - Founders Day
 May 14 -  National Founders Day
 April 2 - International Founders Day

The open motto of the organization is Character, Culture, Courage.

The initiation ceremony is called Krossover.

The annual convention of the Sorority is called its Konvention, held on a rotating basis at locations in the US and Canada during the first weekend of August. An additional celebration, an International Formal Star Ball is held every fifth year to mark significant milestones.

Kappa Beta Gamma's quarterly publication is the Kappa Star.

Headquarters
At its establishment in 1947, the first National Officers were chosen, all from the Beta chapter and were elected to a two-year term.

The Sorority is governed through its international conventions.  Presiding over these annual events, and responsible for the organizations' affairs in the interim between conventions, two separate, but cooperative Boards of Directors, one for the US and one for Canada, are elected to their positions indefinitely by the membership of Kappa Beta Gamma.  There are no term limits of minimum term of service for these Board positions. The Board of Directors is primarily responsible for hiring and management of the International President, supporting the International Board and handling legal and business matters on behalf of the membership.

ΚΒΓ's International Headquarters are located in Georgia.

Day-to-day management of the Sorority is vested in four staff positions: the International President, a Vice-President of Compliance-Canada, a Vice President of Compliance-USA, and a Vice President of Membership Development.

United States Leadership 

Tanya Niemi: President & CEO

Katie Minaghan: Vice President & COO

Allyson Simerlein: Treasurer & CFO

Canada Leadership

Sara-Lynn Pelegrin: President & CEO

Samantha Jennings Willan: Vice President & CCO

Brooke Taylor: Treasurer & CFO

Philanthropy
Kappa Beta Gamma's philanthropy is the Special Olympics. Along with the national philanthropy, each chapter chooses a local philanthropy to support.

Alumnae Society
Kappa Beta Gamma has an Alumnae Society, available to any alumna member.

Chapters
Chapters of Kappa Beta Gamma are as follows.  Active chapters are in bold, inactive chapters are in italics:

References

External links
National website

Student organizations established in 1917
1917 establishments in Wisconsin
Fraternities and sororities in the United States
Fraternities and sororities in Canada